"If I Had $1000000" is a song by the Canadian musical group Barenaked Ladies from their album Gordon. Composed by founding members Steven Page and Ed Robertson, the sing-along track has become one of the band's best-known songs, and is a live show staple, despite never having been a true single and without an accompanying music video. The song reached No. 13 in Canada and eventually charted in the United Kingdom and the United States, peaking also at No. 13 on the UK Rock Chart in 1996, as well as No. 37 on the US Billboard Adult Top 40 in 2000.

History
The song first appeared on one of the later versions of the band's first independent release, Buck Naked. The song subsequently appeared on their second and third tapes, Barenaked Lunch, and The Yellow Tape, as well as their 1991 EP Variety Recordings. In 1991, the song began getting lots of airplay on Toronto radio station CFNY-FM. The song was then released on the band's debut album, Gordon, which would go on to sell over a million copies in Canada. The song has remained very popular and well known since then. An edited version of the Gordon recording of the song later appeared as a bonus track on the UK edition of Born on a Pirate Ship (this version was later released as a single), and a live version of it was featured on Rock Spectacle. The Gordon version was then included on Disc One: All Their Greatest Hits, bringing the total album count for the song to eight.

"If I Had $1000000" gained popularity over the course of the band's early tours, before the release of their first album (Gordon) and became highly requested on radio stations in Canada following the release of Gordon. This prompted the band's label to release a one-track radio single of the song in December 1992. In 1993, the song would be officially released as a commercial single in the UK; a second commercial single was released there in 1996. Another radio single containing the Gordon and Rock Spectacle versions of the song was released in North America later. Despite these releases, the song is often not considered a true single, since it gained popularity before the release of a radio single, and it never had a music video (although stations such has MuchMoreMusic and MuchMoreRetro have occasionally aired a 1992 performance from Intimate and Interactive as a video).

"If I Had $1000000" is one of the earliest-composed Barenaked Ladies songs. It was first conceived as a simple improvised song while Page and Robertson were counsellors at a summer music camp. On the way home from camp, Robertson played the tune for the campers, randomly listing amusing things he would buy with a million dollars. Upon returning to camp, he brought the idea to Page, and the two fleshed out the song. The song has become an icon of Canadian culture, reflecting sentiments on Canadians who wish to win a large lottery prize.

Structure
While hinting at romantic intentions, the lyrics offer eccentric ideas about purchases one would make with a million dollars. The protagonist suggests all the things he would buy for his sweetheart were he a millionaire. Ed Robertson and Steven Page share the vocals: in the verses, it is a call-and-response vocal with Page responding to the lines Robertson starts; in the choruses, Robertson and the rest of the band repeat the harmonized title line while Page responds to the line with further spending ideas.

A trademark of the song developed early on: After each of the first two choruses of the song, the vocals break down into a free-form banter. On each of the song's first three indie cassette appearances (Buck Naked, the Pink Tape and the Yellow Tape), the banter between Page and Robertson lasts only in the remainder of the bar after the last line of the chorus. On Buck Naked, the second banter is followed by an instrumental interlude.

The dialogues became improvisational for Page and Robertson at live shows. When it came time to record Gordon, recognizing that spontaneity in these banters would be vital to the song, the band chose to record a different take of this song each day, with the best one chosen for the album. In live performances, it became traditional for Page and Robertson to improvise entirely new dialogue at these points. Initially the subject tended to flow from the previous sung lyric (a fridge in a treefort after the first chorus, and Kraft Dinner after the second chorus); with time this grew less common, and evolved into one of the two lead singers telling an unrelated anecdote. Since Page's departure from the band in February 2009, keyboardist Kevin Hearn has filled his singing role in concert and all of the remaining band members have picked up some of the bantering with Robertson.

Some of the purchases are humorous references to the lavish spending of pop star Michael Jackson during the 1980s, specifically exotic animals, (an attempt to purchase) the remains of the "Elephant Man" and a pet monkey. For an awards ceremony, Jackson bought Elizabeth Taylor, his friend, a sparkling emerald green dress ('not real emeralds').

The line "but not a real green dress that's cruel" was originally written as "with a tastefully rounded neck". Page incorrectly sang the "cruel" lyric in the studio as a joke, which Robertson found so funny that the rest of the band decided to leave it in the finished song.

Kraft Dinner
A line in the song inspired fans to begin throwing Kraft Dinner at the band during concerts. It initially began as a single box at a 1991 show at the Danforth Music Hall in Toronto. It quickly grew by word-of-mouth, and the number of boxes being thrown rapidly increased. It became so bad that eventually hundreds of boxes were pelted at shows; the band and their instruments were often the target. Especially unpleasant were open cheese packages, which would create a putrid aroma when sitting on stage under hot spotlights. Some diehard fans would go one step further and throw cooked pasta. Eventually, the band requested that fans cease the ritual and instead donate the food via bins set up in the lobbies of their shows for local food banks.

Legacy

The song became an ice cream flavour in May 2009 when the band partnered with American ice cream company Ben & Jerry's to create "If I Had 1,000,000 Flavours". The confection consists of vanilla and chocolate ice cream, peanut butter cups, chocolate-coated toffee chunks, white chocolate chunks and chocolate-coated almonds. The band became the first Canadian band to receive their own ice cream flavour, following in the footsteps of other band-themed Ben & Jerry's flavours such as Cherry Garcia (Jerry Garcia), One Sweet Whirled (Dave Matthews Band) and Phish Food (Phish). All royalties from the sale of "If I Had 1,000,000 Flavours" are donated to the ABC Canada Literacy Foundation, a Toronto-based organization that promotes reading to children at home.

Track listings
Tracks for the two commercial UK singles:
1993
"If I Had $1000000" – 4:27
"Grade 9" (Live) – 3:07
"Crazy" – 4:06

1996
"If I Had $1000000" (UK edit) – 4:15
"Trust Me" – 2:48
"Shoe Box" (Radio Remix) – 3:09

Personnel
 Ed Robertson – co-lead vocal, acoustic guitar
 Steven Page – co-lead vocal
 Jim Creeggan – double bass, backing vocals
 Andy Creeggan – piano, backing vocals
 Tyler Stewart – drums, choir
 Bob Wiseman – accordion, choir
 Dave Allen – fiddle, choir
 Lewis Melville – pedal steel guitar, choir
 The Suburban Tabernacle Choir:
 Arlene Bishop
 Blair Packham
 Chris Brown
 Dave Clark
 David Matheson
 Earl Stokes
 Erica Buss
 Gene Hardy
 Gregor Beresford
 Janet Morassutti
 Jason Mercer
 Jason Plumb
 Jian Ghomeshi
 Jo-Anne Page
 Kate Fenner
 Keith Nakonechny
 Martin Tielli
 Matthew DeMatteo
 Matthew Page
 Meryn Cadell
 Mike Barber
 Mike Ford
 Moxy Früvous
 Murray Foster
 Naida Creeggan
 Natalie Harbert
 Sally Lee
 Shelley Hines
 Steven Pitkin
 Tannis Slimmon
 Tim Vesely
 Veteran Warhorse

Charts

References

1992 singles
1992 songs
Barenaked Ladies songs
List songs
Novelty songs
Reprise Records singles
Songs written by Ed Robertson
Songs written by Steven Page